Spathari is a village and a community in the north-center of the island of Euboea in Greece. The community had a population of 280 in 2011. It is part of the municipal unit Kireas.

References 

Populated places in Euboea